The South American Birdwatching Fair  is an annual event for birdwatchers, held every year in a different country of the continent. It is described as the birder's principal meeting in South America, with people from all the world.

Lovers of wildlife in general and Birdwatching  in particular can find in the fair a space for networking and sharing talks, workshops, seminars and birding trips. Each year's programme includes birding themes in general, recent scientific findings and presentations in many related themes.  A large number of suppliers of binoculars, cameras, books, clothing and other birdwatching equipment, artists and tour companies display and sell their wares, and there are lectures, birding outings and trips, a fellowship dinner and other attractions.

The South American Birdwatching Fair is sponsored by many international organisations, including every country in South America, such as BirdLife International, Wetlands International, Red de Observadores de Aves de Colombia, Aves Argentinas and many more. Companies such as Swarovski, Buenos Días Birding and others support the fair.

The first fair was held in 2010 in San Martín de los Andes (Argentina), and was based on the biggest Bird Fair in the United Kingdom (British Birdwatching Fair ). The San Martín venue was continued until 2012 and subsequent Fairs were held in Paraty, Brazil 2014), and Buenos Aires, Argentina (2016). The 2017 Fair is scheduled to take place in October 2017 in Puerto Varas, Chile, and 2018 in Manizales, Colombia. Official Languages are Spanish, English and Portuguese.

This fair went on hiatus in 2020 & will return in 2021.

All the organisers' profits are donated to a Conservation Projects.

Organization
The Advisory Committee comprises a group of leading figures in ornithology and birdwatching: Tito Narosky (Argentina), Alvaro Jaramillo (Chile), Martha Algiers (Brazil), Raffael Di Biase (Chile), Sergio Ocampo Tobon (Colombia), Steve Sanchez Calle (Peru), and others. The Organising Committee is chaired by Horacio Matarasso and consists of respected birdwatchers in the region.

External links 
 Complete Information and annual programme Official Website
 The Fair in Facebook
 A Portuguese blog: Bonito Birdwatching
 Red de Observadores de Colombia

News about the Fair
 News from Argentina
 Local news
 Web news
 Tiempo Argentino
 Noticias On Line

Pictures of the Fair
See Pictures at album

Ornithology
Birdwatching fairs
Annual events in Argentina